Sergio Della Pergola (born September 7, 1942, in Trieste, Italy) is an Italian-Israeli demographer and statistician. He is a professor and demographic expert, specifically in demography and statistics related to the Jewish population.

Biography
Sergio Della Pergola was born to a Jewish family in Trieste when Italy was under German occupation. His grandfather had been a rabbi. After the war, the family settled in Milan where Della Pergola was an active member of Jewish youth movements and student organizations.

He immigrated to Israel in 1966. He holds an MA in political science from the University of Pavia and a PhD. from the Hebrew University of Jerusalem and is a Professor Emeritus of Population Studies at the Hebrew University’s Avraham Harman Institute of Contemporary Jewry, where he was the Institute Chair and Director of the Division of Jewish Demography and Statistics and held the Shlomo Argov Chair in Israel-Diaspora Relations.

Della Pergola is married to Miriam Toaff and has four children.

Academic career
Della Pergola is a specialist on the demography of world Jewry and has published numerous books and over two hundred papers on historical demography, the family, international migration, Jewish identification, and population projections in the Diaspora and in Israel. He has written extensively about demography in Israel and Palestine. He has lectured at over 70 universities and research centers in Western Europe, North America and Latin America, and served as a senior policy consultant to the President of Israel, the Israeli government, the Jerusalem municipality, and many major national and international organizations.

He served on the National Technical Advisory Committee for the 1990 and 2000-01 National Jewish Population Surveys and on the experts committee of the 2013 Pew Research Center survey of Jewish Americans. He was Visiting Professor at the Oxford Centre for Hebrew and Jewish Studies in 2002-03, at Brandeis University in 2006, at the University of Illinois at Chicago (UIC) in 2009 and at the University of California, Los Angeles (UCLA) in 2010. He is a member of the Yad Vashem Committee for the Righteous of the Nations.

Awards
In 1999, Della Pergola won the Marshall Sklare Award for distinguished achievement from the Association for the Social Scientific Study of Jewry (ASSJ) and his award presentation was entitled: "Thoughts of a Jewish Demographer in the Year 2000". In 2013, he was awarded the Michael Landau prize for Migration and Demography.

References

External links
   
 Sergio Della Pergola vs. the authors of “Voodoo Demographics”

1942 births
Living people
Israeli demographers
Hebrew University of Jerusalem alumni
Academic staff of the Hebrew University of Jerusalem
Israeli statisticians
Italian emigrants to Israel
20th-century Italian Jews
Scientists from Milan
University of Pavia alumni
Israeli people of Italian-Jewish descent